The Prospect Point Observation Tower (also known as the Niagara Falls Observation Tower) is a tower in Niagara Falls, New York, United States just east of the American Falls.

History

The area of the tower and Prospect Point was once known as the High Bank Industrial/Mill District, and hosted industrial use of the area from the 1870s to 1940s.

The tower was originally built in 1961 and extensively refurbished between 2001 and 2003. Improvements included a pre-cast concrete plank observation deck, an ornamental stainless steel deck railing system, improved high-speed elevators, new rest rooms, and a gift shop.

Description
Visitors enter the tower at the ground level from Niagara Falls State Park. It sees eight million visitors annually.

The Maid of the Mist loads at the base of the tower.

References

External links

Towers completed in 1961
Buildings and structures in Niagara Falls, New York
Towers in New York (state)
Tourist attractions in Niagara County, New York
Niagara Falls State Park
Observation towers in the United States
Modernist architecture in New York (state)
Individual elevators
1961 establishments in New York (state)